Nuali Zimin (born 13 January 2000) is a Chinese footballer currently playing as a midfielder for Zibo Qisheng in China League Two.

Career statistics

Club
.

References

2000 births
Living people
Chinese footballers
Association football midfielders
China League Two players
China League One players
Sichuan Jiuniu F.C. players